Bartholomew Opoku (1990 – 9 March 2010) was a Ghanaian footballer who played in the Ghanaian top flight with Kessben. He died after collapsing in a game against Liberty Professionals.

References

1990 births
2010 deaths
Ghanaian footballers
Ghana Premier League players
Medeama SC players
Association football players who died while playing
Sport deaths in Ghana
Association footballers not categorized by position